Ardrossan is a town on the North Ayrshire coast in southwestern Scotland. The town has a population of 10,670 and forms part of a conurbation with Saltcoats and Stevenston known as the 'Three Towns'. Ardrossan is located on the east shore of the Firth of Clyde.

History

Ardrossan's roots can be traced to the construction of its castle 'Cannon Hill', thought to be in around 1140, by Simon de Morville. The castle and estate passed to the Barclay family (also known as Craig) and through successive heirs until the 14th century when it passed to the Eglinton family on the death of Godfrey Barclay de Ardrossan, who died without an heir. Sir Fergus Barclay, Baron of Ardrossan, was said to be in league with the Devil and in one of his dealings, set the task for the Devil to make ropes from sand; on failing to do so, the Devil kicked the castle with his hoof in frustration and left a petrosomatoglyph hoofprint.

The castle stood until 1648, when Oliver Cromwell's troops had it destroyed, taking much of the stonework to Ayr to build the citadel at Montgomerieston. The ruins of Cromwell's Fort still stand, but are overgrown and in a dangerous condition.

In 1759, The 10th Earl of Eglinton formed a herd of the ancient breed of White or Chillingham cattle at Ardrossan, probably using stock from the Cadzow herd. The numbers dropped and in 1820 the remaining animals were dispersed. All the animals in the herd were hornless.

Ardrossan developed during the 18th and 19th centuries thanks to its position on the coast. Exports of coal and pig iron to Europe and North America were the main trade from the town's port, which became a centre for shipbuilding. Fishing vessels and small cargo boats were the mainstay of the shipyard until the 1950s, when the yard ceased to exist as a result of foreign competition. A smaller yard, McCrindle's, operated until the 1980s before it ceased trading.

Passenger services from Ardrossan Harbour to Brodick on the Isle of Arran started in 1834, and services to Belfast, in Ulster in the north of Ireland, and to the Isle of Man followed in 1863 and 1892 respectively. Clyde sailings were operated initially by the Glasgow and South Western Railway Company from Winton Pier and the Caledonian Railway from Montgomerie Pier. The Earl of Eglinton's ambitious plan for a canal link to Glasgow was never realised.

Between 1841 and 1848, Ardrossan was a part of the "West Coast Main Line" equivalent of its time. After 1848 the entire journey could be made by rail, avoiding Ardrossan.
The link to the Isle of Man no longer operates, having first been moved to Stranraer until all Scottish services terminated. Shell-Mex operated an [oil refinery] on behalf of the Air Ministry, from a Second World War aviation-fuel canning factory, and the harbour was expanded for the company's tanker ships to berth.

The harbour has been redeveloped as a marina, and the passenger and vehicle ferry to Brodick is operated by Caledonian MacBrayne.

Ardrossan became a burgh, in 1846, with a provost, magistrates and commissioners. After the Second World War, the burgh was based at Ardrossan Civic Centre. Its burgh status was lost in 1974 on the formation of Strathclyde Regional Council, when it came under Cunninghame District. It is now part of North Ayrshire, created as a unitary authority in 1996.

In 1921 Ardossan was the European site for the first successful reception of medium wave radio signals from North America. Using a wavelength of about 230 to 235 metres (a frequency near 1.3 Megahertz) an amateur radio group in Connecticut sent Morse code signals to a station set up in a tent.

Transport

Railway
Ardrossan South Beach station is at the junction on the Ayrshire Coast Line, where the lines to Ardrossan Harbour and  diverge. All rail services from Ardrossan are operated by ScotRail.

There are two closed railway stations: Ardrossan North was adjacent to Montgomerie Street, and the platform remains can still be seen, although the redevelopment of the former Shell Bitumen Plant site edges closer to the remains. Ardrossan Montgomerie Pier was further down the line from Ardrossan North, but the building of the harbourside apartments removed the last remains of the platforms and no evidence remains that a railway station once stood there.
The last train ran through these stations around 1968, although by that time they served summer boat train services only, after regular passenger traffic ceased in 1932.

Roads and bus services
Ardrossan is linked to Glasgow via the A737 road and to Ayr via the A78 road. The A78 Three Towns Bypass opened in December 2004 and has provided an improvement to local transport links, reducing local travelling times. The bypass has diverted heavier traffic from the Three Towns. Bus services to the town are operated primarily by Stagecoach West Scotland.

Ferry services

A regular ferry service from Ardrossan to Brodick on the Isle of Arran has run since 1834. The ferry departs every two hours and 45 minutes Monday–Saturday and takes 55 minutes. A ferry service to Campbeltown started on 23 May 2013.

In the past Ardrossan had ferry services to Belfast, and, in summer, to the Isle of Man. The Belfast run was operated by the Burns and Laird Line and its last scheduled service was in 1976. The Isle of Man run was operated by the Isle of Man Steam Packet Company during the summer season, and its last service was in 1985, however Caledonian MacBrayne experimented with a smaller vessel for a couple of seasons, which ran one return service per week.

Education
Ardrossan is served by three primary schools (St Peter's Primary School, Stanley Primary School, and Winton Primary School) and two secondary schools: Ardrossan Academy, a non-denominational school opened in 1882, has about 1,050 students from Ardrossan, Saltcoats, West Kilbride and Seamill; St Matthews Academy in Saltcoats is the secondary school for Roman Catholic pupils from Ardrossan.

Energy

Ardrossan is located near two nuclear power stations: Hunterston A, 360 MW and Hunterston B, 1215 MW.

Ardrossan Wind Farm, a 24 MW wind farm that opened in 2004, overlooks the town.

Places of worship
In Ardrossan, there are five churches.

 St.Peter-in-Chains is a Roman Catholic church. Designed by Jack Coia and opened in 1938. Category A Listed building. The Stations of the Cross are by Archibald Dawson.
 Park Church is Church of Scotland. 
 EU Congregational Church
 Church of the Nazarene.

Amenities 
 Eglinton Country Park is linked to Ardrossan by the Sustrans Cyclepath.
 There is a Unionist Club on Princes Street, which was established in 1901 and a Labour Social Club is present in the neighbouring town of Saltcoats.
 The town has two diplomatic missions, a Danish and a Norwegian consulate.
 The town has a municipal cemetery, on Sorbie Road, which was opened in 1854. It contains the graves of 23 sailors who died in the sinking of HMS Dasher.

Governance
Ardrossan is in the Ayrshire North and Arran constituency in the House of Commons and Cunninghame North constituency in the Scottish Parliament. The Westminster seat is held by the Scottish National Party, and the Holyrood seat was gained by the Scottish National Party from Labour in the May 2007 election by a mere 48 votes.

Historically, Ardrossan has been part of the UK parliament constituencies North Ayrshire (1868–1918), Bute and Northern Ayrshire (1918–1983) and Cunninghame North (1983–2005). These constituencies historically returned Conservative or Unionist MPs until 1987, when the constituency was won by the Labour Party.

Sport
Ardrossan is home to a number of sports teams including Ardorssan Winton Rovers, an association football club which plays in the West of Scotland League, and North Ayrshire Table Tennis Club.

Castlehill
Castlehill is also known as 'Cannon Hill' by locals. A historic ancient burial place on Castle Hill was vandalized in the 1950s. One tomb was then taken to the Barony Church on South Crescent for safekeeping.

A prehistoric shell-mound, measuring 102 ft by 16 ft, on the side of Cannon Hill, close to Ardrossan Town railway station, was excavated by the Ayrshire historian John Smith in the 1890s. Its length was mostly overhung by a few feet, by the rock face, which had formed a rock-shelter, which the excavation showed had been occupied at intervals over a considerable period. The railway workings had cut a longitudinal section in the mound, which overlay a 1 ft layer of raised beach sand.

The mound was composed of seashells, mainly periwinkle and limpet, and animal bones.
Relics found included a stone 'anchor' with a groove cut round it for a rope, a possible stone sinker, fragments of very coarse, hammer stone, hand-made pottery, also pieces of wheel-turned, glazed pottery, a bone chisel, two bone needles, etc. No sign of the mound is visible today.

Notable people

Roy Aitken, footballer, captain of Celtic Football Club in the 1980s and captain of the Scotland national team
Sam Black, artist
Flying Officer Kenneth Campbell, recipient of the Victoria Cross
Dugald Drummond, born in Ardrossan in 1840, was chief mechanical engineer with the Caledonian Railway
Peter Drummond, was a senior executive for the Glasgow and South Western Railway
Peter Duncan, former Shadow Secretary of State for Scotland
Bobby Ferguson, goalkeeper for Kilmarnock in the 1960s.
Billy Gilmour (footballer), professional footballer, former youth player of Rangers F.C, and currently Brighton & Hove Albion F.C. 
Janet Hendry, first female pilot in Scotland
Elizabeth Innes (1921 - 2015), paediatric haematologist.
Calum Kennedy (1928–2006), popular exponent of Scottish Gaelic song in the 1950s and 60s
John Kerr, physicist who discovered the now-eponymous Kerr effect.
Campbell Martin, journalist and former Independent Member of the Scottish Parliament for West of Scotland
Mark Menzies, Conservative member of parliament for Fylde
Craig Reid, footballer
W.B. Young, Scottish rugby player
Paul Ireland, film director

Other places with the same name
The name Ardrossan has also been given to places elsewhere in the world:
 Ardrossan, South Australia
 Ardrossan, Alberta
 Ardrossan is the name of a large estate outside Philadelphia, owned by Robert Leaming Montgomery. His daughter, Helen Hope Montgomery Scott, was the inspiration for Tracy Lord, heroine of The Philadelphia Story.

See also
 Industry and the Eglinton Castle estate
 Montfode Castle

References

Further reading
 McSherry, R&M (1996) Old Ardrossan

External links

 Ardrossan & Saltcoats Kirkgate Church
 Irvine Bay Regeneration
 Ardrossan South beach Railway Station
 the3towns.com
 Photographs of every street in Ardrossan
 Video footage of the harbour hydraulic accumulator tower
 Ardrossan Castle video and commentary
http://www.s117059731.websitehome.co.uk/Golden%20Jubilee/GoldenJubileeBook.htm

Burghs
Firth of Clyde
Ports and harbours of Scotland
Towns in North Ayrshire
Ardrossan−Saltcoats−Stevenston
Populated coastal places in Scotland